Park Hee-do (hang-lan:朴熙杜, born 20 March 1986) is a South Korea football player who currently plays for Gangwon FC.

References

External links

1986 births
Living people
South Korean footballers
South Korean expatriate footballers
Busan IPark players
FC Seoul players
Jeonbuk Hyundai Motors players
Ansan Mugunghwa FC players
Al-Khor SC players
Gangwon FC players
K League 1 players
K League 2 players
South Korean expatriate sportspeople in Qatar
Expatriate footballers in Qatar
Dongguk University alumni
Sportspeople from Gangwon Province, South Korea
Qatar Stars League players
Association football midfielders